is a Japanese manga series by Yōhei Yasumura. It has been serialized in Mag Garden's Mag Comi website since December 2016. The series is licensed in North America by Seven Seas Entertainment. An anime television series adaptation by Silver Link aired from July to September 2021.

Synopsis
Kinji Ninomiya is a NEET who has amassed enough money through real-estate investment to fund a penthouse lifestyle without ever having to work. This changes when a portal suddenly transports him to a fantasy world where he quickly ends up enslaved to a mining company extracting crystals from a dungeon. Desperate for a way out of this new poverty, Kinji tries to regain financial stability by any means necessary, gathering himself an unusual adventuring party - the titular black company - in the process.

Characters

The protagonist, a human that will resort to any means to rise up the mining company's ranks despite constant backfiring.

A powerful dragon that shifted into the form of a teenage girl and joined Kinji when he promised her she could taste human food.

A crocodilian demi-human and one of Kinji's co-workers.

A demon and the mine's dungeon master/supervisor.

Media

Manga
It is written and illustrated by Yōhei Yasumura. It has been serialized in Mag Garden's Mag Comi website since December 2016 and has been collected in nine tankōbon volumes. The manga is licensed in North America by Seven Seas Entertainment. It was announced that the manga would enter its climax on June 5, 2020.

Anime
An anime television series adaptation produced by Silver Link was announced, and aired from July 9 to September 24, 2021 on Tokyo MX, TV Aichi, ABC, AT-X, and BS-NTV. The series is directed by Mirai Minato, with scripts overseen by Deko Akao, and characters designed by Yuki Sawairi. Taku Inoue is composing the series' music. The opening theme song "Shimi" (Stain) is performed by Howl Be Quiet, while the ending theme song "World is Mine" is performed by Humbreaders. Funimation licensed the series. Following Sony's acquisition of Crunchyroll, the series was moved to Crunchyroll.

Episode list

Notes

References

External links
 
The Dungeon of Black Company at Mag Comi 
The Dungeon of Black Company English website at Seven Seas Entertainment

Anime series based on manga
Comedy anime and manga
Crunchyroll anime
Isekai anime and manga
Japanese webcomics
Mag Garden manga
Seven Seas Entertainment titles
Shōnen manga
Silver Link
Webcomics in print